Nate Myles (born 24 June 1985) is an Australian former rugby league footballer who played in the 2000s and 2010s, he last played for the Melbourne Storm in the National Rugby League. A Queensland State of Origin and Australia national representative forward, he previously played for Canterbury-Bankstown, Sydney Roosters, Gold Coast Titans and Manly-Warringah.

Canterbury-Bankstown
Myles was a Canterbury junior and a housemate of fellow future NRL stars Sonny Bill Williams and Johnathan Thurston. As 2004 NRL premiers, the Canterbury-Bankstown Bulldogs faced Super League IX champions, Leeds in the 2005 World Club Challenge. Myles played from the interchange bench in the Bulldogs' 32-39 loss.

Myles made his first grade debut for Canterbury in round 1 of the 2005 NRL season against St. George Illawarra at Telstra Stadium.

In 2006 he was picked to represent Queensland in the State of Origin competition.  At club level, Myles played in Canterbury's 2006 preliminary final defeat against the Brisbane Broncos at the Sydney Football Stadium.  This would be Myles last game for Canterbury and he joined the Sydney Roosters for the 2007 NRL season.

Sydney Roosters
Myles moved to the Sydney Roosters for the 2007 NRL season.  In November 2006, Myles was charged with drink driving following a Melbourne Cup luncheon. Sydney Roosters imposed a fine of $10,000, 20 hours of community charity work and forced him to undergo alcohol counselling.

Myles first season at the club saw them miss the finals series after finishing 10th.  In August 2008, Myles was named in the preliminary 46-man Kangaroos squad for the 2008 Rugby League World Cup.

In April 2009, he was named in the preliminary 25 man squad to represent Queensland in the opening State of Origin match for 2009. Following another alcohol-related incident, Myles was suspended for six matches by the NRL. At 8am on 5 July 2009 Myles was found drunk and naked on the fire escape of the Crowne Plaza in Terrigal, New South Wales. He had earlier tried to gain entry into one of the hotel's rooms, and had also defecated in the hotel's corridor. This incident was referenced by the media as "Dumpgate '09".

At club level, Myles made 17 appearances for the Sydney Roosters in the 2009 NRL season as the club finished last for the first time since 1966. 
In 2010, the club had a complete form reversal and reached the 2010 NRL Grand Final against St. George Illawarra.  Myles played at second-row in the decider as the Roosters were defeated 32-8 at Telstra Stadium.

Myles played for Australia in the 2010 Four Nations tournament. In December 2010 he became engaged to Home and Away actress Tessa James. The pair wed on 23 December 2011.

Gold Coast Titans
Myles was selected to play in all three matches of the 2012 State of Origin series, being awarded the Wally Lewis Medal as man of the series, which was won by Queensland for the seventh consecutive year.
At the 2012 Dally M Awards Myles was named the NRL's second-row forward of the year. He was also named the 2012 Gold Coast Titans season's best player and awarded the club's annual Paul Broughton Medal.

He was named a Titans co-captain for 2013 alongside Greg Bird. Myles was selected for Australia in the 2013 ANZAC Test and played from the interchange bench. In what was the first test match ever played in Canberra, New Zealand were defeated. Myles played all three games of the 2013 State of Origin series in which Queensland extended their record for consecutive series victories to eight.

In game 1 of the 2013 State of Origin series, Myles was involved in a fight with New South Wales player Paul Gallen.  Gallen alleged that Myles had twisted his knee in the previous tackle.  Gallen then punched Myles twice in the face with Myles barely moving.  The memorable melee was one of the last significant Origin stoushes before punching was outlawed in all forms of the game.

Manly-Warringah
On 13 May 2015, Myles signed a three-year contract with the Manly Warringah Sea Eagles starting in 2016.

Melbourne Storm
On 14 June 2017, Myles announced he had signed a mid season transfer to the Melbourne Storm.

Myles initially played for the Storm's feeder team, Eastern Suburbs Tigers, playing against the Sunshine Coast Falcons at Suzuki Stadium, Langlands Park, the end result going down to a field goal, Easts winning 17-16. On 8 July, he made his Storm debut against the Parramatta Eels in round 18 at AAMI Park.

On 19 November 2017, Myles announced his retirement from the NRL.

Personal life

In December 2010, Myles became engaged to actress Tessa James. The pair wed on 23 December 2011. They have 3 children although only announced publicly the birth of one.

References

External links
Manly Sea Eagles profile

Nate Myles at the Gold Coast Titans official website.

1985 births
Living people
Australian rugby league players
Australia national rugby league team players
Canterbury-Bankstown Bulldogs players
Gold Coast Titans players
Gold Coast Titans captains
Manly Warringah Sea Eagles players
Melbourne Storm players
Queensland Rugby League State of Origin players
NRL All Stars players
Prime Minister's XIII players
Rugby league locks
Rugby league players from Cairns
Rugby league second-rows
Rugby league props
Sydney Roosters players